John Nevil Maskelyne, known professionally as Nevil Maskelyne (1863–1924), was a British magician and inventor.

Biography
Maskelyne was born in 1863 Cheltenham (bapt 22 July 1863) to stage magician John Nevil Maskelyne (1839-1917) and his wife Elizabeth née Taylor (1840-1911).

Following his father's death he assumed control of Maskelyne's Ltd.

In wireless telegraphy he was the manager of Anglo-American Telegraph Company which controlled the Valdemar Poulsen patents.

He was a public detractor of Guglielmo Marconi in the early days of radio (wireless). In 1903 he hacked into Marconi's demonstration of wireless telegraphy, and broadcast his own message, hoping to make Marconi's claims of "secure and private communication" appear foolish.

Works

Maskelyne wrote several books on magic, including Our Magic: The Art in Magic, the Theory of Magic, the Practice of Magic (with David Devant) and On the Performance of Magic.

Family and death

 Maskelyne married Ada Mary Ardley (1863–1918) on 9 July 1888 at St Mary's Church, Battersea, London. They had three sons and a daughter: 
 John Nevil (known as Jack), who was to become a noted author on railway matters and editor of Model Railway News in the early 20th century (J.N. Maskelyne) 
 Noel
 Jasper (1902–73), who continued the family tradition of professional magic.
 Mary

He died in Marylebone on 22 September 1924.

References

External links
 Our Magic: The Art in Magic, the Theory of Magic, the Practice of Magic

1863 births
1924 deaths
British inventors
British magicians
British sceptics
Radio pioneers
Amateur radio people
People from Cheltenham